The Mianwali District, is a district located in Mianwali Division of Punjab province, Pakistan. It has a border with the Chakwal, Attock, Kohat, Karak, Lakki Marwat, Dera Ismail Khan, Bhakkar, and Khushab Districts.

The main languages spoken in the district include Saraiki (76.05%), Pashto (11.53%), Punjabi (9.35%), and Urdu (2.76%).

History
The history of the district is tied to the Miana family which came from Baghdad and settled in Mianwali. The name Mianwali is derived from Sufi saint Mian Ali's name. Mian Ali Mianwali was a known settlement and an agricultural region with forests during the Indus Valley Civilization (c. 3300 – c.1300 BCE). Mianwali later became part of the Vedic civilization.

After the Islamic conquest of Punjab, Arabs who had established themselves in Multan were in control of Mianwali and surrounding areas of Punjab.

In 997 CE, Sultan Mahmud Ghaznavi took over the Ghaznavid dynasty empire established by his father, Sultan Sebuktegin. In 1005 CE he conquered the Hindu Shahis and followed it by the conquests of the Punjab region. The Delhi Sultanate and later Mughal Empire ruled the region. Mianwali was associated with Multan province of Mughal Empire as it had large saraiki population. The population of the Punjab region became majority Muslim, following the conquests by various Muslim dynasties from Central Asia. The real historical representation of the Mianwali Region is older than 900 AD but the true accuracy is traced to the arrival of Qutb Shah in 1090 AD in this region who in later years of his conquest allowed his sons to settle and further rule the region. Their lineage still exists to date in Mianwali District as well as in Pakistan and are known as Awan Tribe. Historically, all major rulers of South Asia governed this area in their turn. Mughal emperor Babur mentioned Isakhel in the Baburnama when describing his campaigns against the Malik Awans and Niazi Pakhtuns during his invasion of Punjab in the 1520s.

Prior to the invasion of Nadir Shah in 1738, there is little to relate concerning the history of the northern part of the district. The upper half of the district was ruled by the Gakhars, who became feudatories of the Mughal Empire, of which the district continued to form a part until the invasion of Nadir Shah. In 1738 a portion of his army entered Chashma, and by its atrocities so cowed the Bannuchis and Marwats that a heavy tribute was raised from them. Another portion of the army crossed the Darra Pezu and worked its way down to Dera Ismail Khan. Contingents raised from the neighborhoods of Bannu and Dera Ismail Khan marched under Nadir Shah's banner to the sack of Delhi. In 1739 the area west of the Indus was surrendered by the Emperor of Delhi to Nadir Shah and passed after his death to Ahmad Shah Abdali. In 1748 a Durrani army under one of Ahmad Shah's generals crossed the Indus at Kalabagh, and drove out the Ghakkars, who still ruled in the cis-Indus tracts of the district, owing nominal allegiance to the Emperor at Delhi. Their stronghold, Muazzam Nagar, was razed to the ground, and with their expulsion was swept away the last vestige of the authority of the Mughal Emperor in these parts. During British Raj Mianwali District was also among the states of British Punjab where regional offices of East India Company were in position until winter of 1883 when the regional office of East India Company in Mianwali was Shutdown due to civil unrest and hostile conditions.

Geography

The area in north is a continuation of the Pothohar Plateau and the Kohistan-e-Namak. Southern side of the district is a part of Thal Desert. Indus River flows through the district.

Climate
Mianwali district has an extreme climate, with a long, hot summer season and cold, dry winters. Summer lasts from May to September and winter lasts from November till February. June is the hottest month with average temperatures of 42 °C (highest recorded temperature 52 °C); in winter, December and January monthly average temperatures can be as low as 3 to 4 °C. The average rainfall in the district is about 385 mm.

Administration
The district is administratively divided into three tehsils 7 Municipal Committees and 51 union councils:

Demographics 
At the time of the 2017 census the district had a population of 1,542,601, of which 771,969 were males and 770,502 females. Rural population is 1,214,789 while the urban population is 327,812. The literacy rate was 61.28%.

Religion 
As per the 2017 census Muslims made up almost the entire population with 99.53%, although there is a small mainly urban minority of Christians numbering 7,000.

Language 
At the time of the 2017 census, 76.05% of the population spoke Saraiki, 11.53% Pashto, 9.35% Punjabi and 2.76% Urdu as their first language.

People
 Mian Sultan Zikria - Famous Sufi Saint from the Mianwali District
 Nawab Malik Amir Mohammad Khan - Chief of the Awan tribe, Nawab of Kalabagh ,Former Governor of West Pakistan.
 Tilok Chand Mehroom – Urdu poet
 Jagannath Azad – Urdu-Speaking poet of Hindu academic.
 Imran Khan – Former captain of the Pakistan cricket team who won the 1992 Cricket World Cup and has been elected twice the member of National Assembly of Pakistan from Mianwali and the 22nd Prime minister of Islamic Republic Of Pakistan .
 Attaullah Khan Esakhelvi – Folk Singer
 Abdul Sattar Khan Niazi – religious and political leader of Pakistan
 Misbah-ul-Haq – Pakistani Cricketer
 Sher Afgan Niazi – The Ex-Minister of Law and Member of Parliament
 Sardar Khan Niazi – Chief Editor and Publisher of Daily Pakistan, Daily The Patriot, Daily Pak Watan, Daily Action, Daily Nawa-e-Nawabshah, Monthly Naya Rukh, and also Chairman of Pakistan Group of Publications.
 Shadab Khan – Pakistani Cricketer.
 Aqeela Asifi – Afghan refugee and teacher who has educated thousands of other Afghan refugee children in Mianwali
General Amir Abdullah Khan Niazi - Ex. Commandent Eastern Command Bengal.

Places of interest

 Mari Indus railway station
 Kalabagh Dam
 Jinnah Barrage
 Chashma Barrage
 Namal Lake
Kundian Railway Station
Daud Khel Railway Station
Mari Indus Railway Station

See also
 Mianwali
Issa Khel
Piplan
Kundian

Further reading
"Manaqib-E-Sultani" By Mian Alamgir
"Wichara Watan" By Harish Chander Nakra, New Delhi, India

References

External links

 Early history of Niazi tribe
 Niazi Chiefs in the Mughal empire
Mianwali Online

 
Districts of Punjab, Pakistan